John Edgar Bush (20 August 1928 – 1 June 2015) was an English cricketer in the 1950s.  

Bush was born in Oxford, Oxfordshire. He attended Magdalen College School, Oxford, before going on to Magdalen College at Oxford University. A right-handed batsman, he made his first-class debut for Oxford University against the Free Foresters in 1950.  He played 7 further first-class matches for the University, the last coming against Cambridge University in 1952.  In his 8 first-class matches, he scored 417 runs at a batting average of 29.78, with a high score of 67.  This came against Middlesex in 1952.

Bush made his debut for Oxfordshire before playing for Oxford University, first appearing in the 1949 Minor Counties Championship against Buckinghamshire.  Bush played Minor counties cricket for Oxfordshire from 1949 to 1973 which included 139 Minor Counties Championship matches.  He made his only List A appearance for Oxfordshire against Cambridgeshire in the 1967 Gillette Cup.  In this match he scored 14 runs before being dismissed by Alan Wilson.

He was a schoolmaster at St Lawrence College, Ramsgate, from 1956 until his retirement in 1988.

References

External links
John Bush at ESPNcricinfo
John Bush at CricketArchive

1928 births
2015 deaths
Cricketers from Oxford
English cricketers
Oxfordshire cricketers
Oxford University cricketers
People educated at Magdalen College School, Oxford
Alumni of Magdalen College, Oxford
People from Northbourne, Kent